Stefen Markus Fangmeier (born December 9, 1960, in El Paso, Texas, United States) is an American visual effects supervisor and film director. He worked on numerous major feature films, including Lemony Snicket's A Series of Unfortunate Events, Saving Private Ryan, Terminator 2: Judgment Day, Twister, The Perfect Storm and Master and Commander: The Far Side of the World. He also has been a second unit director for two films, Dreamcatcher (2003) and Galaxy Quest (1999). After more than 15 years of visual effects work, Fangmeier moved into feature film directing with his debut on Eragon, which was released in 2006 to negative critic reviews but was a box office success .

Since Eragon, Fangmeier has largely focused on supervising and directing visual effects, including for the eighth season of Game of Thrones and Sin City: A Dame to Kill For. Fangmeier speaks German as well as English, and lives in Los Angeles.

References

External links

1960 births
Living people
American production designers
American people of German descent
Artists from El Paso, Texas
Best Visual Effects BAFTA Award winners
Visual effects supervisors
Film directors from Texas
California State University, Dominguez Hills alumni